Quinlan Sharif McAfee (born January 18, 2001), better known by his stage name Quin NFN (formerly Quincho), is an American rapper, singer, and songwriter from Austin, Texas. He is best known for his singles "Talkin' My Shit," "Straight Thru," and "Poles" (featuring NLE Choppa).

He released his debut commercial mixtape, 4Nun, on October 25, 2019. He released his second mixtape, Quincho, on March 27, 2020. He released his third mixtape, Never on Time, on March 17, 2023.

Early life 
Quinlan McAfee was born in Austin, Texas, on January 18, 2001. He started rhyming and writing rap songs at six years old. As stated in interviews, he cites Lil Wayne as "the first inspiration to basically make me wanna rap." He has also said that rapper Young Pappy inspired him "to get in the studio and talk shit." The first album he purchased was Lil Wayne's Tha Carter III.

Career

2016-2017: Early fame and debut EP 
According to McAfee, he did not start recording music until the end of 2016. By that time, he started gaining attention in his hometown of Austin, Texas. However, his first hit song did not come until he released the single "Game Time Pt. 2" in August 2017. He followed this up with the releases of songs such as "Gang Shit", "Revenge", and "Lil Gangsta", with the former two being featured on his debut EP Stain or Starve.

2018-2019: Big success and debut mixtape 
McAfee gained national success after the release of two of his biggest singles to date, "Talkin' My Shit" and "Straight Thru", which both had music videos uploaded onto the popular Jmoney1041 YouTube channel in late 2018, helping them gain traction. These singles helped McAfee sign a record deal with 10K Projects. He followed this success up with hit singles such as "How I'm Living" and "NFN ENT", both of which accumulated over a million views on YouTube.

On October 25, 2019, McAfee released his debut mixtape, 4Nun. The tape included features from NLE Choppa and PnB Rock, and one of the singles from the tape, "Poles" featuring NLE Choppa, went on to become one of McAfee's most popular singles.

2020-present: Second mixtape 
McAfee released his second mixtape, Quincho, on March 27, 2020. The tape included no features and four previously released tracks.

Discography

Mixtapes

Collaborative Mixtapes

Extended plays

Singles

As lead artist

As featured artist

Guest appearances

References 

2001 births
Living people
African-American male rappers
21st-century American rappers
Rappers from Austin
American child musicians
21st-century American male musicians
21st-century African-American musicians